John Leonard Powers (born November 6, 1948) is a journalist and author who wrote for The Boston Globe for more than four decades in the Sports, Metro, Sunday Magazine, and Living sections and later became a freelance correspondent for the newspaper. Many sportswriters consider him the dean of Olympic journalists; he has covered every Olympic Games (summer and winter) since 1976, excepting the 1980 Summer Olympics in  Moscow, when the U.S. boycott led the Russians to refuse to issue a visa. He may well have reported from more Olympics than any other American sportswriter. Powers was an integral part of a highly regarded sportswriting team at the Globe. “From the mid-1970s to the early '80s,” Sports Illustrated wrote in 2009, “the Globe contained arguably the greatest collection of reporting talent ever assembled in a sports section…”  He has also written or co-authored 11 books.

Biography

Early life and education

Born in Cambridge, Massachusetts, the first child of a Boston policeman, Powers graduated in 1966 from Boston Latin School.  In 1970 he earned an A.B. cum laude from Harvard University and, while there, wrote for the sports section of The Harvard Crimson student newspaper. From 1970 to 1972, Powers served as a United States Navy line officer aboard an aircraft carrier, the USS Franklin D. Roosevelt.

Career

Besides covering the Olympics, Powers has written about nearly all major sports, at both the college and professional levels, and filed stories from five continents. His range encompasses not only "major" sports like football, baseball, and basketball, but includes  smaller sports like gymnastics and rowing. He was a vital contributor to The Third H Book of Harvard Athletics, the standard reference on the athletic history of his alma mater. In soccer, Powers has reported from five FIFA World Cups and two FIFA Women's World Cups.  He has led the Boston Globe'''s coverage of the Boston Marathon and covered that event for nearly five decades.

Personal life

Powers married Elaine LePage in 1974. They have two sons, Jonathan and Evan, and three grandchildren. The family lived for many years in Wellesley, Massachusetts, until moving to Brewster, Massachusetts, on Cape Cod.

Honors and awards

Powers shared the 1983 Pulitzer Prize for National Reporting for a special issue of The Boston Globe Sunday Magazine titled “War and Peace in the Nuclear Age.”

In 2011, Powers received the Boston Athletic Association's Will Cloney Award, presented to an individual who has promoted the sport of running, especially locally.

Powers was a Poynter Fellow Poynter Fellowship in Journalism at Yale University.

BibliographyThe Short Season: A Boston Celtics Diary, 1977-78. HarperCollins, 1979. Yankees: An Illustrated History (with George Sullivan). Prentice Hall, 1982. One Goal: A Chronicle of the 1980 U.S. Olympic Hockey Team (with Arthur C. Kaminsky). HarperCollins, 1984. Mary Lou: Creating an Olympic Champion (with Mary Lou Retton). McGraw-Hill, 1985.  Seasons to Remember: The Way It Was in American Sports, 1945-60 (with Curt Gowdy). HarperCollins, 1993. The Boston Handbook (with illustrator Peter Wallace). On Cape Publications, 1999. The Boston Dictionary (with illustrator Peter Wallace). On Cape Publications, 2004.  Fenway Park: A Salute to the Coolest, Cruelest, Longest-Running Major League Baseball Stadium in America (with Ron Driscoll). Running Press Adult, 2012. The Third H Book of Harvard Athletics: 1963-2012 (with John Veneziano).  Harvard Varsity Club, 2014.The Head of the Charles Regatta: First 50 Head of the Charles Regatta, 2015.  Fridays with Bill: Inside the Football Mind of Bill Belichick'' Thorndike Books, 2018.

References

American male journalists
Pulitzer Prize for National Reporting winners
Harvard University alumni
People from Cambridge, Massachusetts
1948 births
Living people